Normandy (from Old French , plural of Normant, originally from the word for "northman" in several Scandinavian languages) is a geographical and cultural region in northwestern Europe, roughly coextensive with the historical Duchy of Normandy.

Normandy comprises mainland Normandy (a part of France) and the Channel Islands (mostly the British Crown Dependencies). Its population is 3,499,280. The inhabitants of Normandy are known as Normans, and the region is the historic homeland of the Norman language. Large settlements include Rouen, Caen, Le Havre and Cherbourg.

The cultural region of Normandy is roughly similar to the historical Duchy of Normandy, which includes small areas now part of the departments of Mayenne and Sarthe. The Channel Islands (French: Îles Anglo-Normandes) are also historically part of Normandy; they cover  and comprise two bailiwicks: Guernsey and Jersey, which are British Crown Dependencies.

Normandy's name comes from the settlement of the territory by Vikings ("Northmen") starting in the 9th century, and confirmed by treaty in the 10th century between King Charles III of France and the Viking jarl Rollo. For almost 150 years following the Norman conquest of England in 1066, Normandy and England were linked by having the same person reign as both Duke of Normandy and King of England.

History

Prehistory
Archaeological finds, such as cave paintings, prove that humans were present in the region in prehistoric times. Normandy has also many megalithic monuments.

Celtic period
Celts (also known as Belgae and Gauls) have populated Normandy since at least the Bronze Age. When Julius Caesar invaded Gaul (58–50 BC), there were nine different Celtic tribes living in this part of Gaul.

Romanisation
The Romanisation of this region partly included in the Gallia Celtica and in the Gallia Belgica (the Seine being more or less the limit between them) was achieved by the usual methods: Roman roads and a policy of urbanisation. Classicists mention many Gallo-Roman villas  and archeology found their traces in the past 30 years. In the Late Roman Empire a new province was created and called Lugdunensis Secunda, it sketched the later ecclesiastical province of Rouen, with the Metropolis civitas Rotomagensium
(Rouen), Civitas Baiocassium (Augustodorum, Bayeux), Civitas Abrincatum (Ingena, Avranches), Civitas Ebroicorum (Mediolanum, Évreux), Civitas Saiorum (Sées), Civitas Lexoviorum (Noviomagus, Lisieux / Lieuvin) and Civitas Constantia (Coutances).

Germanic invasions and settlements
In the late 3rd century AD, Germanic raids devastated ″Lugdunensis Secunda″ as the modern area of Normandy was known as at the time. The Romans built a system of coastal defences known as Saxon Shore on both sides of the English channel. Coastal settlements were raided by Saxon pirates, that finally settled mainly in the Bessin region. Modern archeology reveals their presence in different Merovingian cemeteries excavated east of Caen. Christianity also began to enter the area during this period and Rouen already had a metropolitan bishop by the 4th century. The ecclesiastical province of Rouen was based on the frame of the Roman Lugdunensis Secunda, whose limits corresponded almost exactly to the future duchy of Normandy. In 406, Germanic tribes began invading from the east, followed by dispersed settlements mainly in pays de Bray, pays de Caux and Vexin. As early as 487, the area between the River Somme and the River Loire came under the control of the Frankish lord Clovis.

Viking raids and foundation of the Norman state
Vikings started to raid along the river Seine during the middle of the 9th century. As early as 841, a Viking fleet appeared at the mouth of the Seine, the principal route by which they entered the kingdom. After attacking and destroying monasteries, including one at Jumièges, they took advantage of the power vacuum created by the disintegration of Charlemagne's empire to take northern France. The fiefdom of Normandy was created for the Viking leader Hrólfr, known in Medieval Latin as Rollo. Rollo had besieged Paris but in 911 entered vassalage to the king of the West Franks, Charles the Simple, through the Treaty of Saint-Clair-sur-Epte. In exchange for his homage and fealty, Rollo legally gained the territory that he and his Viking allies had previously conquered. The name "Normandy" reflects Rollo's Viking (i.e. "Norseman") origins.

The descendants of Rollo and his followers created an aristocracy that step by step adopted the local Gallo-Romance language, intermarried with the area's native Gallo-Frankish inhabitants, and adopted Christianity. Nevertheless, the first generations of Scandinavian and Anglo-Scandinavian settlers brought slaves, mainly from the British Isles, and often turned the women into frilla, a Scandinavian tradition which became known as more Danico, medieval Latin meaning "Danish marriage". The first counts of Rouen and the dukes of Normandy had concubines too. While very little archeological excavations about the Vikings were done in Normandy, the Norman toponymy retains a large Scandinavian and Anglo-Scandinavian heritage, due to a constant use of Old Norse during four or five generations in certain parts of Normandy.

They then became the Normans – a Norman French-speaking mixture of Norsemen and indigenous Gallo-Franks.

Rollo's descendant William became king of England in 1066 after defeating Harold Godwinson, the last of the Anglo-Saxon kings, at the Battle of Hastings, while retaining the fiefdom of Normandy for himself and his descendants.

Norman expansion

Aside from the conquest of England and the subsequent invasions of Wales and Ireland, the Normans expanded into other areas. Norman families, such as that of Tancred of Hauteville, Rainulf Drengot and Guimond de Moulins played important parts in the conquest of southern Italy and the Crusades.

The Drengot lineage, de Hauteville's sons William Iron Arm, Drogo, and Humphrey, Robert Guiscard and Roger the Great Count progressively claimed territories in southern Italy until founding the Kingdom of Sicily in 1130. They also carved out a place for themselves and their descendants in the Crusader states of Asia Minor and the Holy Land.

The 14th-century explorer Jean de Béthencourt established a kingdom in the Canary Islands in 1404. He received the title King of the Canary Islands from Pope Innocent VII but recognized Henry III of Castile as his overlord, who had provided him with military and financial aid during the conquest.

13th to 17th centuries

In 1204, during the reign of John of England, mainland Normandy was taken from the English kingdom by the King of France Philip II, that ended with this conquest some 293 years of relative Norman independence from the French crown. Insular Normandy (the Channel Islands) remained, however, under control of the king of England and still attached to the ecclesiastical province of Rouen. In 1259, Henry III of England recognized the legality of French possession of mainland Normandy under the Treaty of Paris. His successors, however, often fought to regain control of their ancient fiefdom.

The Charte aux Normands granted by Louis X of France in 1315 (and later re-confirmed in 1339) – like the analogous Magna Carta granted in England in the aftermath of 1204 – guaranteed the liberties and privileges of the province of Normandy.

French Normandy was devastated by the civil wars and conflicts against the English power during the Hundred Years' War. Between 1419 and 1450 strong English forces occupied Normandy, except the Mont-Saint-Michel, and made of Rouen, the seat of their power in France. It explains why Joan of Arc was burnt in Rouen, but not in Paris. Normandy lost three-quarters of its population during the war. Afterwards, prosperity returned to Normandy until the Wars of Religion. When many Norman towns (Alençon, Rouen, Caen, Coutances, Bayeux) joined the Protestant Reformation, battles ensued throughout the province. In the Channel Islands, a period of Calvinism following the Reformation was suppressed when Anglicanism was imposed following the English Civil War.

Samuel de Champlain left the port of Honfleur in 1604 and founded Acadia. Four years later, he founded the City of Québec. From then onwards, Normans engaged in a policy of expansion in North America. They continued the exploration of the New World: René-Robert Cavelier de La Salle travelled in the area of the Great Lakes, then on the Mississippi River. Pierre Le Moyne d'Iberville and his brother Lemoyne de Bienville founded Louisiana, Biloxi, Mobile and New Orleans. Territories located between Québec and the Mississippi Delta were opened up to establish Canada and Louisiana. Colonists from Normandy were among the most active in New France, comprising Acadia, Canada, and Louisiana.

Honfleur and Le Havre were two of the principal slave trade ports of France.

Modern history

Although agriculture remained important, industries such as weaving, metallurgy, sugar refining, ceramics, and shipbuilding were introduced and developed.

In the 1780s, the economic crisis and the crisis of the Ancien Régime struck Normandy as well as other parts of the nation, leading to the French Revolution. Bad harvests, technical progress and the effects of the Eden Agreement signed in 1786 affected employment and the economy of the province. Normans laboured under a heavy fiscal burden.

In 1790 the five departments of Normandy replaced the former province.

13 July 1793, the Norman Charlotte Corday assassinated Marat.

The Normans reacted little to the many political upheavals which characterized the 19th century. Overall they warily accepted the changes of régime (First French Empire, Bourbon Restoration, July Monarchy, French Second Republic, Second French Empire, French Third Republic).

Following the French Revolutionary Wars and the Napoleonic Wars (1792–1815) there was an economic revival that included the mechanization of textile manufacturing and the introduction of the first trains.

With seaside tourism in the 19th century came the advent of the first beach resorts.

During the Second World War, following the armistice of 22 June 1940, continental Normandy was part of the German occupied zone of France. The Channel Islands were occupied by German forces between 30 June 1940 and 9 May 1945. The town of Dieppe was the site of the unsuccessful Dieppe Raid by Canadian and British armed forces.

The Allies, in this case involving Britain, the United States, Canada and Free France, coordinated a massive build-up of troops and supplies to support a large-scale invasion of Normandy in the D-Day landings on 6 June 1944 under the code name Operation Overlord. The Germans were dug into fortified emplacements above the beaches. Caen, Cherbourg, Carentan, Falaise and other Norman towns endured many casualties in the Battle of Normandy, which continued until the closing of the so-called Falaise gap between Chambois and Mont Ormel. The liberation of Le Havre followed. This was a significant turning point in the war and led to the restoration of the French Republic.

The remainder of Normandy was liberated only on 9 May 1945 at the end of the war, when the Channel Island occupation effectively ended.

Geography

The historical Duchy of Normandy was a formerly independent duchy occupying the lower Seine area, the Pays de Caux and the region to the west through the Pays d'Auge as far as the Cotentin Peninsula and Channel Islands.

Western Normandy belongs to the Armorican Massif, while most of the region lies in the Paris Basin. France's oldest rocks are exposed in Jobourg, on the Cotentin peninsula. The region is bounded to the north and west by the English Channel. There are granite cliffs in the west and limestone cliffs in the east. There are also long stretches of beach in the centre of the region. The bocage typical of the western areas caused problems for the invading forces in the Battle of Normandy. A notable feature of the landscape is created by the meanders of the Seine as it approaches its estuary.

The highest point is the Signal d'Écouves (417 m), in the Armorican Massif.

Normandy is sparsely forested: 12.8% of the territory is wooded, compared to a French average of 23.6%, although the proportion varies between the departments. Eure has the most cover, at 21%, while Manche has the least, at 4%, a characteristic shared with the Channel Islands.

Sub-regions

Mainland Normandy 
 Avranchin
 Bessin
 Bauptois
 Bocage virois
 Campagne d'Alençon
 Campagne d'Argentan
 Campagne de Caen
 Campagne de Falaise
 Campagne du Neubourg
 Campagne de Saint-André (or d’Évreux)
 Cotentin
 Perche
 Domfrontais or Passais
 Hiémois
 Lieuvin
 Mortainais
 Pays d'Auge, central Normandy, is characterized by excellent agricultural land.
 Pays de Bray
 Pays de Caux
 Pays d'Houlme
 Pays de Madrie, area between the Seine and the Eure.
 Pays d'Ouche
 Roumois et Marais-Vernier
 Suisse Normande (Norman Switzerland), in the south, presents hillier terrain.
 Val de Saire 
 Vexin normand

Insular Normandy (Channel Islands)
 The bailiwick of Jersey
 The bailiwick of Guernsey (Fr. Bailliage de Guernesey)

The Channel Islands are considered culturally and historically a part of Normandy. However, they are British Crown Dependencies, and are not part of the modern French administrative region of Normandy,

Although the British surrendered claims to mainland Normandy, France, and other French possessions in 1801, the monarch of the United Kingdom retains the title Duke of Normandy in respect to the Channel Islands. The Channel Islands (except for Chausey) remain Crown Dependencies of the British Crown in the present era. Thus the Loyal Toast in the Channel Islands is Le Roi, notre Duc ("The King, our Duke"). The British monarch is understood to not be the Duke with regards to mainland Normandy described herein, by virtue of the Treaty of Paris of 1259, the surrender of French possessions in 1801, and the belief that the rights of succession to that title are subject to Salic Law which excludes inheritance through female heirs.

Rivers

Rivers in Normandy include:
 the Seine and its tributaries:
 the Andelle
 the Epte
 the Eure
 the Risle
 the Robec
And many coastal rivers:
 the Bresle
 the Couesnon, which traditionally marks the boundary between the Duchy of Brittany and the Duchy of Normandy
 the Dives
 the Orne
 the Sée
 the Sélune
 the Touques
 the Veules, the shortest French coastal river
 the Vire

Politics

Mainland Normandy 
The modern region of Normandy was created by the territorial reform of French Regions in 2014 by the merger of Lower Normandy, and Upper Normandy. The new region took effect on 1 January 2016, after the regional elections in December 2015.

The Regional Council has 102 members who are elected under a system of proportional representation. The executive consists of a president and vice-presidents. Hervé Morin from the Centre party was elected president of the council in January 2016.

Channel Islands 
The Channel Islands are not part of French territory, but are instead British Crown Dependencies. They are self-governing, each having its own parliament, government and legal system. The head of state of both territories is Charles III and each have an appointed Lieutenant-Governor.

The Bailiwick of Guernsey comprises three separate jurisdictions: Guernsey, Alderney and Sark. Administratively, Herm forms part of Guernsey.

Economy
Much of Normandy is predominantly agricultural in character, with cattle breeding the most important sector (although in decline from the peak levels of the 1970s and 1980s). The bocage is a patchwork of small fields with high hedges, typical of western areas. Areas near the Seine (the former Upper Normandy region) contain a higher concentration of industry. Normandy is a significant cider-producing region, and also produces calvados, a distilled cider or apple brandy. Other activities of economic importance are dairy produce, flax (60% of production in France), horse breeding (including two French national stud farms), fishing, seafood, and tourism. The region contains three French nuclear power stations.
There is also easy access to and from the UK using the ports of Cherbourg, Caen (Ouistreham), Le Havre and Dieppe. Jersey and Guernsey are often considered to be tax havens, due to having large financial services sectors and low tax rates.

Demographics 
In January 2006 the population of French Normandy (including the part of Perche which lies inside the Orne département but excluding the Channel Islands) was estimated at 3,260,000 with an average population density of 109 inhabitants per km2, just under the French national average, but rising to 147 for Upper Normandy. The population of the Channel Islands is estimated around 174,000 (2021).

The main cities (population given from the 1999 census) are Rouen (518,316 in the metropolitan area), the capital since 2016 of the province and formerly of Upper Normandy; Caen (420,000 in the metropolitan area) and formerly the capital of Lower Normandy; Le Havre (296,773 in the metropolitan area); and Cherbourg (117,855 in the metropolitan area).

Culture

Flag
The traditional provincial flag of Normandy, gules, two leopards passant or, is used in the region and its predecessors. The three-leopard version (known in the Norman language as les treis cats, "the three cats") is used by some associations and individuals, especially those who support cultural links with the Channel Islands and England. Jersey and Guernsey use three leopards in their national symbols. The leopards represents the strength and courage Normandy has towards the neighbouring provinces.

The unofficial anthem of the region is the song "Ma Normandie".

Language

The Norman language, including its insular variations Jèrriais and Guernésiais, is a regional language, spoken by a minority of the population on the continent and the islands, with a concentration in the Cotentin Peninsula in the far west (the Cotentinais dialect), and in the Pays de Caux in the East (the Cauchois dialect).

Many words and place names demonstrate the Old English and Norse (Anglo-Scandinavian) influence in this Oïl language; for example, words : mauve (seagull), fifotte (starfish), hâ (catshark), mucre (humid, wet), (é)griller (slide, slip), fale (throat), etc. place-names : -bec (stream), -fleur (river), -hou (island), -tot (homestead), -dal / -dalle (valley), Hogue / Hougue (hill, mound), -lon / -londe (grove, wood), -vy / -vic (bay, cove), -mare (pond), -beuf (booth, cabin), etc. French is the only official language in continental Normandy and English is also an official language in the Channel Islands.

Architecture

Architecturally, Norman cathedrals, abbeys (such as the Abbey of Bec) and castles characterise the former duchy in a way that mirrors the similar pattern of Norman architecture in England following the Norman Conquest of 1066.

Domestic architecture in upper Normandy is typified by half-timbered buildings that also recall vernacular English architecture, although the farm enclosures of the more harshly landscaped Pays de Caux are a more idiosyncratic response to socio-economic and climatic imperatives. Much urban architectural heritage was destroyed during the Battle of Normandy in 1944 – post-war urban reconstruction, such as in Le Havre and Saint-Lô, could be said to demonstrate both the virtues and vices of modernist and brutalist trends of the 1950s and 1960s. Le Havre, the city rebuilt by Auguste Perret, was added to Unesco's World Heritage List in 2005.

Vernacular architecture in lower Normandy takes its form from granite, the predominant local building material. The Channel Islands also share this influence – Chausey was for many years a source of quarried granite, including that used for the construction of Mont Saint-Michel.

The south part of Bagnoles-de-l'Orne is filled with bourgeois villas in Belle Époque style with polychrome façades, bow windows and unique roofing. This area, built between 1886 and 1914, has an authentic “Bagnolese” style and is typical of high-society country vacation of the time. The Chapel of Saint Germanus (Chapelle Saint-Germain) at Querqueville with its trefoil floorplan incorporates elements of one of the earliest surviving places of Christian worship in the Cotentin – perhaps second only to the Gallo-Roman baptistry at Port-Bail. It is dedicated to Germanus of Normandy.

Gastronomy

Parts of Normandy consist of rolling countryside typified by pasture for dairy cattle and apple orchards. A wide range of dairy products are produced and exported. Norman cheeses include Camembert, Livarot, Pont l'Évêque, Brillat-Savarin, Neufchâtel, Petit Suisse and Boursin. Normandy butter and Normandy cream are lavishly used in gastronomic specialties. Jersey and Guernsey cattle are famous cattle breeds worldwide, especially to North America.

Turbot and oysters from the Cotentin Peninsula are major delicacies throughout France. Normandy is the chief oyster-cultivating, scallop-exporting, and mussel-raising region in France.

Normandy is a major cider-producing region (very little wine is produced). Perry is also produced, but in less significant quantities. Apple brandy, of which the most famous variety is calvados, is also popular. The mealtime trou normand, or "Norman hole", is a pause between meal courses in which diners partake of a glassful of calvados in order to improve the appetite and make room for the next course, and this is still observed in many homes and restaurants. Pommeau is an apéritif produced by blending unfermented cider and apple brandy. Another aperitif is the kir normand, a measure of crème de cassis topped up with cider. Bénédictine is produced in Fécamp.

Other regional specialities include tripes à la mode de Caen, andouilles and andouillettes, salade cauchoise, salt meadow (pré salé) lamb, seafood (mussels, scallops, lobsters, mackerel...), and teurgoule (spiced rice pudding).

Normandy dishes include duckling à la rouennaise, sautéed chicken yvetois, and goose en daube. Rabbit is cooked with morels, or à la havraise (stuffed with truffled pigs' trotters). Other dishes are sheep's trotters à la rouennaise, casseroled veal, larded calf's liver braised with carrots, and veal (or turkey) in cream and mushrooms.

Normandy is also noted for its pastries. Normandy turns out douillons (pears baked in pastry), craquelins, roulettes in Rouen, fouaces in Caen, fallues in Lisieux, sablés in Lisieux. It is the birthplace of brioches (especially those from Évreux and Gisors). Confectionery of the region includes Rouen apple sugar, Isigny caramels, Bayeux mint chews, Falaise berlingots, Le Havre marzipans, Argentan croquettes, and Rouen macaroons.

Normandy is the native land of Taillevent, cook of the kings of France Charles V and Charles VI. He wrote the earliest French cookery book named Le Viandier. Confiture de lait was also made in Normandy around the 14th century.

Literature

The dukes of Normandy commissioned and inspired epic literature to record and legitimise their rule. Wace, Orderic Vitalis and Stephen of Rouen were among those who wrote in the service of the dukes. After the division of 1204, French literature provided the model for the development of literature in Normandy. Olivier Basselin wrote of the Vaux de Vire, the origin of literary vaudeville. Notable Norman writers include Jean Marot, Rémy Belleau, Guy de Maupassant, Jules Barbey d'Aurevilly, Gustave Flaubert, Octave Mirbeau, and Remy de Gourmont, and Alexis de Tocqueville. The Corneille brothers, Pierre and Thomas, born in Rouen, were great figures of French classical literature.

David Ferrand (1591–1660) in his Muse Normande established a landmark of Norman language literature. In the 16th and 17th centuries, the workers and merchants of Rouen established a tradition of polemical and satirical literature in a form of language called the parler purin. At the end of the 18th century and beginning of the 19th century a new movement arose in the Channel Islands, led by writers such as George Métivier, which sparked a literary renaissance on the Norman mainland. In exile in Jersey and then Guernsey, Victor Hugo took an interest in the vernacular literature. Les Travailleurs de la mer is a well-known novel by Hugo set in the Channel Islands. The boom in insular literature in the early 19th century encouraged production especially in La Hague and around Cherbourg, where Alfred Rossel, Louis Beuve and Côtis-Capel became active. The typical medium for literary expression in Norman has traditionally been newspaper columns and almanacs. The novel Zabeth by André Louis which appeared in 1969 was the first novel published in Norman.

Painting

Normandy has a rich tradition of painting and gave to France some of its most important artists.

In the 17th century some major French painters were Normans like Nicolas Poussin, born in Les Andelys and Jean Jouvenet.

Romanticism drew painters to the Channel coasts of Normandy. Richard Parkes Bonington and J. M. W. Turner crossed the Channel from Great Britain, attracted by the light and landscapes. Théodore Géricault, a native of Rouen, was a notable figure in the Romantic movement, its famous Radeau de la Méduse being considered come the breakthrough of pictorial romanticism in France when it was officially presented at the 1819 Salon. The competing Realist tendency was represented by Jean-François Millet, a native of La Hague. The landscape painter Eugène Boudin, born in Honfleur, was a determining influence on the impressionists and was highly considered by Monet.

Breaking away from the more formalised and classical themes of the early part of the 19th century, Impressionist painters preferred to paint outdoors, in natural light, and to concentrate on landscapes, towns and scenes of daily life.

Leader of the movement and father of modern painting, Claude Monet is one of the best known Impressionists and a major character in Normandy's artistic heritage. His house and gardens at Giverny are one of the region's major tourist sites, much visited for their beauty and their water lilies, as well as for their importance to Monet's artistic inspiration. Normandy was at the heart of his creation, from the paintings of Rouen's cathedral to the famous depictions of the cliffs at Étretat, the beach and port at Fécamp and the sunrise at Le Havre. It was Impression, Sunrise, Monet's painting of Le Havre, that led to the movement being dubbed Impressionism. After Monet, all the main avant-garde painters of the 1870s and 1880s came to Normandy to paint its landscapes and its changing lights, concentrating along the Seine valley and the Norman coast.

Landscapes and scenes of daily life were also immortalised on canvas by artists that have included : William Turner, Gustave Courbet, the Honfleur born Eugène Boudin, Camille Pissarro, Alfred Sisley, Auguste Renoir, Gustave Caillebotte, Eugène Chigot,  Paul Gauguin, Georges Seurat, Paul Signac, Pierre Bonnard, Georges Braque and Pablo Picasso. While Monet's work adorns galleries and collections all over the world, a remarkable quantity of Impressionist works can be found in galleries throughout Normandy, such as the Museum of Fine Arts in Rouen, the Musée Eugène Boudin in Honfleur or the André Malraux Museum in Le Havre.

Maurice Denis, one of the leaders and theoricists of the Nabis movement in the 1890s, was a native of Granville, in the department of Manche. Marie-Thérèse Auffray, an expressionist painter and member of the French resistance during WWII, lived and painted in the village of Échauffour.

The Société Normande de Peinture Moderne was founded in 1909 by Pierre Dumont, Robert Antoine Pinchon, Yvonne Barbier and Eugène Tirvert. Among members were Raoul Dufy, a native of Le Havre, Albert Marquet, Francis Picabia and Maurice Utrillo. Also in this movement were the Duchamp brothers, Jacques Villon and Marcel Duchamp, considered one of the father of modern art, also natives of Normandy. Jean Dubuffet, one of the leading French artist of the 1940s and the 1950s was born in Le Havre.

Religion

Christian missionaries implanted monastic communities in the territory in the 5th and 6th centuries. Some of these missionaries came from across the Channel. The influence of Celtic Christianity can still be found in the Cotentin. By the terms of the treaty of Saint-Clair-sur-Epte, Rollo, a Viking pagan, accepted Christianity and was baptised. The Duchy of Normandy was therefore formally a Christian state from its foundation. The cathedrals of Normandy have exerted influence down the centuries in matters of both faith and politics. King Henry II of England, did penance at the cathedral of Avranches on 21 May 1172 and was absolved from the censures incurred by the assassination of Thomas Becket. Mont Saint-Michel is a historic pilgrimage site.

Normandy does not have one generally agreed patron saint, although this title has been ascribed to Saint Michael, and to Saint Ouen. Many saints have been revered in Normandy down the centuries, including:
 Aubert who's remembered as the founder of Mont Saint-Michel
 Marcouf and Laud who are important saints in Normandy
 Helier and Samson of Dol who are evangelizers of the Channel Islands
 Thomas Becket, an Anglo-Norman whose parents were from Rouen, who was the object of a considerable following in mainland Normandy following his martyrdom
 Joan of Arc who was martyred in Rouen, and who is especially remembered in that city
 Thérèse de Lisieux whose birthplace in Alençon and later home in Lisieux are a focus for religious pilgrims.
 Germanus of Normandy

Since the 1905 French law on the Separation of the Churches and the State there is no established church in mainland Normandy. In the Channel Islands, the Church of England is the established church.

People
See :Category:People from Normandy

Gallery

See also

 Duchy of Normandy
 Duke of Normandy

Notes

References

External links

  Normandie Héritage 
 The Norman Worlds
 Gallery of photos of Normandy

 
Former provinces of France
Divided regions
Geographical, historical and cultural regions of France
Historical regions